Rue de Nesle is a street in Saint-Germain-des-Prés in the 6e arrondissement of Paris, France.

History

The street was opened in 1607. It was formerly called Rue d'Anjou Dauphine. Its current name comes from the fact that the street is located at the former location of the Hôtel de Nesle.

According to historians, an underground passage going to the Tour de Nesle existed at de number 13 of the street and was used by Marguerite de Bourgogne to reach the Tour de Nesle.

Access

Features
It is home to the Museum of Letters and Manuscripts and it crosses with Rue Dauphine. It is in short distance from the Seine and the Louvre Museum.

See also
 The Doge on the Bucintoro near the Riva di Sant'Elena

References

External links

 Nomenclature 
 History of Rue de Nesle 

Nesle